The Maryland-National Capital Park Police (MNCPP) is the law enforcement branch of the Maryland-National Capital Park and Planning Commission (MNCPPC) and has two divisions, one in Prince George's County and one in Montgomery County in Maryland. The MNCPP in Prince George's County is also known as "Maryland Park Police" or "Maryland Park."  The MNCPP in Montgomery County is known as "The Montgomery County Park Police"

History
The Maryland Park Police was created by the MNCPPC in 1953 by legislation to patrol and police all of the designated parks in Prince George's and Montgomery counties. For the first two years of its existence, Maryland Park officers had only a single car to share and had to use it until it became defunct.

Duties
The MNCPP is a full-service, bi-county agency charged with investigating crimes and traffic infractions committed within MNCPPC jurisdiction.

The MNCPP (Montgomery County Division) has an authorized strength of 91 sworn officers and 21 civilian personnel.
The MNCPP (Prince George's County Division) has an authorized strength of 125 sworn officers and 28 civilian personnel.

Fleet

The Maryland Park Police use a fleet of Ford Crown Victoria Police Interceptors, Harley Davidson Police Edition Motorcycles, Ford Taurus,  Ford Explorers, Chevrolet Impala, Chevy Tahoes, Dodge Chargers, ATVs, mountain bikes, horses and Marine Boats.

See also 

 List of law enforcement agencies in Maryland
 United States Park Police
 Park Police

References

External links
Maryland-National Capital Park Police

Specialist police departments of Maryland
1953 establishments in Maryland
Park police departments of the United States